Hsp90 co-chaperone Cdc37 is a protein that in humans is encoded by the CDC37 gene.

The protein encoded by this gene is highly similar to Cdc 37, a cell division cycle control protein of Saccharomyces cerevisiae. This protein is a HSP90 Co-chaperone with specific function in cell signal transduction. It has been shown to form complex with Hsp90 and a variety of protein kinases including CDK4, CDK6, SRC, RAF1, MOK, as well as eIF-2 alpha kinases. It is thought to play a critical role in directing Hsp90 to its target kinases.

Interactions 

CDC37 has been shown to interact with:

 CDK4, 
 HSP90AA1 
 IKBKG, 
 IKK2,  and
 STK11.

Domain architecture

CDC37 consists of three structural domains. The N-terminal domain binds to protein kinases.  The central domain is the Hsp90 chaperone (heat shock protein 90) binding domain. The function of the C-terminal domain is unclear.

References

Further reading

External links 
 

Co-chaperones